Johnny Moore's Three Blazers was a popular American vocal group in the 1940s and 1950s.
The original members were: 
Johnny Moore (John Dudley Moore, October 20, 1906, Austin, Texas – January 6, 1969, Los Angeles, California); 
Charles Brown (Tony Russell Brown, September 13, 1922, Texas City, Texas – January 21, 1999, Oakland, California); 
Eddie Williams (Edward Earl Williams, June 12, 1912, San Augustine, Texas – February 18, 1995, Los Angeles).

Career
Johnny Moore and his younger brother Oscar grew up in Texas and then Phoenix, Arizona, where they both started playing guitar and formed a string band. In the mid-1930s they relocated to Los Angeles, where Oscar Moore, who had been influenced by Charlie Christian and turned to jazz, joined the King Cole Trio.

Johnny Moore remained devoted to rhythm and blues. His guitar style is considered to have been an influence on Chuck Berry. He joined and formed several groups, before forming the Three Blazers with two other Texans, the bassist Eddie Williams and the pianist and singer Charles Brown, who was newly arrived in the city. After the King Cole Trio moved from Atlas Records to Capitol in 1943, Oscar Moore suggested to Atlas boss Robert Scherman that he replace them with his brother's group. Scherman agreed and in 1945 they had their first hit, backing Ivory Joe Hunter on "Blues at Sunrise".

In 1946, they had their greatest success with "Driftin' Blues", sung by Brown. Moore refused to sign an exclusive contract with any record company, so the group's early records appeared on various labels, particularly Philo (which later became Aladdin Records), Exclusive Records, and Modern Records. The group followed up the success of "Driftin' Blues" with several other big R&B hits, including "Sunny Road" (1946), "New Orleans Blues" (1947), and "Merry Christmas Baby" (1947, also a hit in 1948 and 1949).

In 1947, the Three Blazers performed at the third Cavalcade of Jazz concert held at Wrigley Field in Los Angeles which was produced by Leon Hefflin, Sr. on September 7, 1947. The Valdez Orchestra, The Blenders, T-Bone Walker, Slim Gaillard, The Honeydrippers, Johnny Otis and his Orchestra, Woody Herman, and the Sarah Vaughn also performed that same day.

In 1948, frustrated by his lack of recognition and financial reward, Brown left the group for a successful solo career. The remaining two Blazers continued with a succession of vocalists, notably Lee Barnes, Billy Valentine, Floyd Dixon, Mari Jones, Nelson Alexander and, in the mid-1950s, Frankie Ervin. After Nat King Cole broke up his original King Cole Trio, Oscar Moore played as a guest with brother Johnny's group. Johnny Moore and the Blazers continued to record for small labels until the early 1960s.

Discography

Singles
Atlas releases
107 "Melancholy Madeline" (vocal by Frankie Laine) / "Fugue in C Major" (instrumental), 1945
110 "Tell Me You'll Wait for Me" (vocal by Charles Brown) / "Escapade" (instrumental), 1945
124 "Maureen" (vocal by Frankie Laine) / "Knightfall: Dedicated to Guy Knight" (instrumental), 1946

Philo releases
111 "Baby Don't You Cry" / "Blazer's Boogie" (instrumental), 1945
112 "Drifting Blues" / "Groovy", 1945

Aladdin releases
129 "You Are My First Love" / "Race Track Blues", 1946
130 "Till the Real Thing Comes Along" / "Rocks in My Bed", 1946 
183 "Drifting Blues" (reissue) / "Till the Real Thing Comes Along" (reissue), 1947
184 "Baby Don't You Cry" (reissue) / "You Are My First Love" (reissue), 1947
Modern Music releases
131 "Travelin' Blues" (also known as "Drifting Blues, Part 2") / "It's the Talk of the Town", 1946 
133 "What Do You Know About Love" / "Society Boogie" (B-side by Hadda Brooks), 1946 
134 "Warsaw Concerto (Part 1)" (instrumental) / "Warsaw Concerto (Part 2)" (instrumental), 1946
135 "I'll Get Along Somehow" / "Morocco Blues" (B-side by Hadda Brooks), 1946 
139 "How Deep Is the Ocean" / "You Showed Me the Way", 1946
142 "You Won't Let Me Go" / "Shuffle Boogie" (B-side by Will Rowland & His Orchestra), 1946 
143 "You Left Me Forsaken" / "So Long", 1946
151 "Sail On Blues" / "Blue Because of You", 1947
152 "Make Believe Land" / "Nursery Rhyme Boogie" (B-side by Happy Johnson & His Jive Five), 1947 
154 "If You Ever Should Leave" / "It Had to Be You", 1948

Exclusive releases
204 "Axis Doom Blues" (vocal by Johnnie McNeil) / "You Taught Me to Love", 1946
205 "You Taught Me to Love" / "Johnny's Boogie" (instrumental), 1946 
205 "End o' War Blues" (vocal by Johnnie McNeil) / "Johnny's Boogie" (re-release), 1946 
209 "Blues at Sunrise" (with Ivory Joe Hunter) / "You Taught Me to Love" (with Ivory Joe Hunter), 1946 
214 "C.O.D." / "There Is No Greater Love", 1946 	
221 "It Ain't Gonna Be Like That" / "With My Heart in My Hand", 1946 
224 "My Silent Love" / "Googie's Boogie" (instrumental), 1946 
226  "I Want You, I Need You" / "Hard Tack" (instrumental), 1946	 
233 "Be Fair with Me" / "Sunny Road", 1946
234 "Bobby Sox Blues" / "(Was I to Blame For) Falling in Love with You", 1946  
240 "New Orleans Blues" /" I Surrender Dear", 1947 
243 "Better Watch What You Do" / "I Love to Make Love to You", 1947
246 "I Cried for You" / "Pasadena", 1947 
249 "Moonrise" / "Juke Box Lil ", 1947 
251 "Changeable Woman Blues" / "Why Is Love Like That", 1947 
254  "Merry Christmas Baby" / "Lost in the Night", 1947 
257 "Money's Getting Cheaper" / "It's Over", 1948
259 "Soothe Me" / "Scratch Sheet" (instrumental), 1948  
261 "Teresa" / "Cold in Here", 1948 
265 "Groovy Movie Blues" /" Free Lancin' Again", 1948  
268 "I'm So Happy I Could Cry" / "Don't Get Salty, Sugar", 1948	 
272 "You Better Change Your Way of Lovin'" / "Friendless Blues", 1948

Modern releases
20-599 "More Than You Know" / "Variety Bounce" (B-side by Hadda Brooks), 1948
20-646 "Drifting Blues, Part 2" (reissue) / "Going Home Blues" (B-side by Hootie McShann Trio), 1949
20-689 "When Your Lover Has Gone" / "I'll Never Know Why" (B-side by Hadda Brooks), 1949  
20-731 "I'll Get Along Somehow" (reissue) / "What Do You Know About Love" (reissue), 1950 
20-768 "Nutmeg" (instrumental) / "What Do You Know About Love" (reissue), 1950

Exclusive releases
40X "Jilted Blues" / "Any Old Place with Me", 1948
47X "I'm Looking for Love" / "Huggin' Bug", 1948
53X "Walkin' in Circles" / "Lonesome Blues", 1948
56X "Blues at Sunrise" (with Ivory Joe Hunter) (reissue) / "You Taught Me to Love" (with Ivory Joe Hunter) (reissue), 1948
63X "Merry Christmas Baby" (reissue) / "Lost in the Night" (reissue), 1948
69X "Where Can I Find My Baby" / "Snuff Dippin' Mama", 1949
86X "Love Me Tonight" / "Peek-a-Boo", 1949  
101X "Tomorrow" / "Tonight I'm Alone", 1949 
107X "Groovy Movie Blues" (reissue) / "New Orleans Blues" (reissue), 1949 
111X "B.&O. Blues" / "I Hate Myself", 1949 
120X "I'll Miss You" / "So There", 1949	 
143X "If You Don't, Why Don't Ya" / "If I Had You", 1949
150X "Twenty-Four Hours a Day" / "I Certainly Would", 1949

RCA Victor releases
How Blue Can You Get, 1949
22-0020 "Blues for What I've Never Had" / "How Could I Know", 1949
22-0025/50-0009 "A New Shade of Blues" / "This Is One Time, Baby (You Ain't Gonna Two-Time Me), 1949
22-0034/50-0018 "Bop-a-Bye Baby" / "What Does It Matter", 1949        
22-0042/50-0026 "Walkin' Blues" / "You Can Go Feed Yourself", 1949   
22-0047/50-0031 "Cut Off the Fat (Take Out the Bone)" / "Shuffle Shuck", 1949           
22-0059/50-0043 "So Long" / "Driftin' Blues", 1949                 
22-0073/50-0073 "Misery Blues" / "Rock with It", 1950             
22-0086/50-0086 "Rain-Chick" / "Melody", 1950                       
22-0095/50-0095 "Someday You'll Need Me" / "The Jumping Jack", 1950

Swing Time releases
238 "Merry Christmas Baby" (reissue) / "Lost in the Night" (reissue), 1950
253 "I'll Miss You" (reissue) / "New Orleans Blues" (reissue), 1951 
259 "Sunny Road" (reissue) / "Be Fair with Me" (reissue), 1951 
276 "Changeable Woman Blues" (reissue) / "Moonrise" (reissue), 1952

Albums
10-inch (78-rpm) two-disc album set
1947 Johnny Moore's 3 Blazers, recorded 1945 (Aladdin A-2), including the following 78-rpm discs:
183 "Drifting Blues" (side 1) / "Till the Real Thing Comes Along" (side 2)
184 "You Are My First Love" (side 3) / "Baby Don't You Cry" (side 4)

10-inch (78-rpm) three-disc album set
1947 Johnny Moore's Three Blazers, recorded 1945–1946 (Exclusive EX-1002), including the following 78-rpm discs:
703 "St. Louis Blues" (side 1) / "Gloria" (side 6)
704 "I Wouldn't Mind" (side 2) / "Way over There by the Cherry Tree" (side 5)
705 "Be Sharp, You'll See" (instrumental) (side 3) / "Now That You're Gone Away" (side 4)

LP and CD releases and selected compilations
1978 Sunny Road, Charles Brown & Johnny Moore's Three Blazers, recorded 1945–1960 (Route 66 KIX-5)
1980 Race Track Blues, Charles Brown & Johnny Moore's Three Blazers, recorded 1945–1956 (Route 66 KIX-17)
1986 Why Johnny Why, Johnny Moore's Blazers, recorded 1949–1956 (Route 66 KIX-33)
1986 Let's Have a Ball, Charles Brown (with Johnny Moore's Three Blazers), recorded 1945–1961 (Route 66 KIX-34)
1989 This Is One Time, Baby, Johnny Moore's Three Blazers, recorded 1945–1949 (Jukebox Lil JB-1105)
1989 Sail On Blues, Charles Brown & Johnny Moore's Three Blazers, recorded 1945–1947 (Jukebox Lil JB-1106)
1995 Snuff Dippin' Mama, Charles Brown with Johnny Moore's Three Blazers (Night Train International 7017)
1995 Walkin' in Circles, Charles Brown with Johnny Moore's Three Blazers (Night Train International 7024)
1996 The Chronological Charles Brown: 1944–1945, with Johnny Moore's Three Blazers (Classics #894)
1996 Drifting & Dreaming, Charles Brown with Johnny Moore's Three Blazers (Modern Records material) ((Ace CHD-589)
1998 Los Angeles Blues: Complete RCA Recordings 1949–1950, Johnny Moore's Three Blazers Featuring Oscar Moore (Westside WESD-217), two-CD set
1998 The Chronological Charles Brown: 1946, with Johnny Moore's Three Blazers (Classics 971)
2000 The Chronological Charles Brown: 1946–1947, with Johnny Moore's Three Blazers (Classics 1088)
2001 The Chronological Charles Brown: 1947–1948, with Johnny Moore's Three Blazers (Classics 1147)
2003 Charles Brown: The Classic Earliest Recordings, with Johnny Moore's Three Blazers (JSP 7707), five-CD box set
2005 The Best of Charles Brown: West Coast Blues, with Johnny Moore's Three Blazers (Blues Forever 6828)
2007 Johnny Moore's Three Blazers: Be Cool: The Modern & Dolphin Sessions 1952–1954 (Ace CHD-1148)
2007 Groovy, Charles Brown with Johnny Moore's Three Blazers (Rev-Ola CRBAND-13)
2012 The Cool Cool Blues of Charles Brown 1945–1961, with Johnny Moore's Three Blazers (Jasmine 3030), two-CD set
2019 The Singles Collection 1945-1952, Johnny Moore's Three Blazers (Acrobat ACTRCD-9079), three-CD set

References

External links
 More information

African-American musical groups
Modern Records artists
Combo Records artists